Valora Noland (born Valor Baum; December 8, 1941 – March 27, 2022) was an American actress, notable for her 1960s movie and television work, and, in her later years, photographer and author.

Biography
Noland was born in Seattle, Washington, as Valor Baum, on December 8, 1941, the day after Pearl Harbor. Her mother named her "Valor", inspired by a speech by Winston Churchill. Her family moved from Seattle to the countryside near Santa Cruz, California in 1943. Sometime around 1959 she decided to become an actress. After graduating from Santa Cruz High School, she was accepted by the Pasadena Playhouse and, while studying there for a year and a half, settled on "Valora Noland" for her stage name and moved to Hollywood.

Valora's first job was an improvised scene with three other actors for the film Five Finger Exercise, later cut before distribution. Still, it enabled her to buy her SAG card, and somewhat larger parts in TV shows followed. She had a small role in a 1961 episode of the TV western The Rifleman entitled "High Country".

She played Vinnie in The Donna Reed Show episode entitled "Everywhere That Mary Goes." Her first movie role was in Beach Party (1963), and the next year, 1964, she played a part in an independent production, Summer Children, made on Catalina Island. It was never officially released. This was followed by Muscle Beach Party and after that a film titled Sex and the College Girl, which took place on Puerto Rico. A third "island" film came in 1965 when she was chosen to play the unfaithful wife in The Passionate Strangers, a Philippine production. 

Back in Hollywood, Valora joined the cast of The War Wagon for a minimal role and appeared in guest roles in television shows including The Man from U.N.C.L.E., The Virginian, Star Trek, and Mannix as Cindy Gier in "Live Blueberries". Season 1 episode 7.

Noland was also active as a photographer and, as Valora Tree, authored the books "Horse Stories", and Water Lily Ponds, a volume of poetry.

Noland died on March 27, 2022, at the age of 80 in Sebastopol, California.

Characters

Clare in The Rifleman episode, "The High Country" (1961)
Vinnie in The Donna Reed Show episode, "Everywhere That Mary Goes" (1963)
Vickie in Sex and the College Girl (1964)
Duchess Vicky in The Man from U.N.C.L.E episode, "The Round Table Affair" (1966)
Amanda Harley in The Virginian episode, "Girl on the Pinto" (1967)
Daras in Star Trek episode, "Patterns of Force" (1968)

Filmography

Beach Party (1963) - Rhonda
Muscle Beach Party (1964) - Animal
Sex and the College Girl (1964) - Vickie
Summer Children (1965) - Diana
The Passionate Strangers (1966) - Margaret Courtney
The War Wagon (1967) - Kate

References

External links

1941 births
2022 deaths
20th-century American actresses
21st-century American women
American film actresses
American television actresses
Actresses from Seattle
Photographers from Washington (state)